Vittoria Reati (born 26 July 1996) is an Italian professional racing cyclist. She rides for the S.C. Michela Fanini Rox team.

See also
 List of 2015 UCI Women's Teams and riders

References

External links
 

1996 births
Living people
Italian female cyclists
People from Massa Lombarda
Sportspeople from the Province of Ravenna
Cyclists from Emilia-Romagna